Mannose receptor C-type 1 is a protein that in humans is encoded by the MRC1 gene.

Function
The recognition of complex carbohydrate structures on glycoproteins is an important part of several biological processes, including cell-cell recognition, serum glycoprotein turnover, and neutralization of pathogens. The protein encoded by this gene is a type I membrane receptor that mediates the endocytosis of glycoproteins by macrophages. The protein has been shown to bind high-mannose structures on the surface of potentially pathogenic viruses, bacteria, and fungi so that they can be neutralized by phagocytic engulfment.

References

Further reading